Aleksandr Aleksandrovich Tatarkin (born 4 July 1966) is a Russian professional football coach and a former player. He is an assistant coach with FC SKA Rostov-on-Don.

Club career
He made his professional debut in the Soviet Second League in 1984 for FC Rubin Kazan.

Honours
 Russian Premier League champion: 1992.
 Russian Premier League runner-up: 1995.
 Russian Premier League bronze: 1994.
 Soviet Cup winner: 1992.

References

External sources

 

1966 births
Living people
Footballers from Kazan
Soviet footballers
Russian footballers
Russian expatriate footballers
NK Istra players
Croatian Football League players
Expatriate footballers in Croatia
FC Rubin Kazan players
FC SKA Rostov-on-Don players
FC Rostov players
FC Spartak Moscow players
FC Lokomotiv Moscow players
FC Tyumen players
FC Lada-Tolyatti players
FC Volgar Astrakhan players
Russian Premier League players
Russian football managers
Association football forwards